Ringuelet may refer to:

People
Adela Ringuelet, Argentine astronomer
5793 Ringuelet, asteroid named after her
Raúl Adolfo Ringuelet, Argentine zoologist

Places
Ringuelet, Buenos Aires